Dilek is a town in the central district (Malatya)  of Malatya Province, Turkey. At , Dilek is situated several kilometers southwest of Karakaya Dam resorvoir. It lies to the east of Turkish state highway  which connects Malatya to Sivas. The railroad from Malatya to north also passes through Dilek. The population of Dilek  is 7971  as of 2011. In 1964 Dilek was declared a seat of township. Major economic activity of the town is fruit gardening. Apricot is the main product.

References

Populated places in Malatya Province
Towns in Turkey
Malatya Central District